Jorge Yllescas (born 22 August 1973) is a Peruvian wrestler. He competed in the men's Greco-Roman 48 kg at the 1996 Summer Olympics.

References

1973 births
Living people
Peruvian male sport wrestlers
Olympic wrestlers of Peru
Wrestlers at the 1996 Summer Olympics
Place of birth missing (living people)
20th-century Peruvian people